Houhai ( 'Rear Lake') is a lake and its surrounding neighborhood in Xicheng District of central Beijing, China. Houhai is the largest of the three lakes, along with Qianhai 'Front Lake' and Xihai 'Western Lake', that comprise Shichahai, the collective name for the three northernmost lakes in central Beijing. Since the early 2000s, the hutong neighborhood around Houhai has become known for its nightlife as many residences along the lake shore have been converted into restaurants, bars, and cafes.  The area is especially popular with foreign tourists visiting Beijing and is also often visited by the expatriate community and the younger generations of locals.

The Former Residence of Soong Ching-ling and Prince Gong Mansion are both located in the Houhai neighborhood.

History 
The artificial lake of Houhai was built during the Yuan dynasty, and formed part of the ancient waters of the dynasty. The area was gentrified by the Yuan, and was exclusively reserved to the royal family. Built in the Yuan winter capital of Dadu, today it is located in the center of Beijing. It faces the Forbidden City, and today is renowned as a place of relaxation for Beijingers, and for its nightlife.

Also the street network of Houhai was created during the Yuan dynasty. The Yuan's 787-meter long Nanluogu Lane is considered one of the oldest hutongs in Beijing, located in one of its oldest neighborhoods. Many buildings are very old, and exhibit the traditional Beijing architectural features.

Access 
Beijing Bus routes 5, 60, 90, 107 and 204 stop at the Drum Tower, just east of Houhai. The nearest subway station at Beihai North on Line 6 is about half a kilometer west of Qianhai.  To reach Houhai, subway riders must walk north along the shore of Qianhai to Houhai.

Images

References

External links 
 New York Times: Houhai Market
 TripAdvisor: Back Lakes (Hou Hai) "This area of Beijing contains some of the most extensive old hutong neighborhoods and the three lakes of Xihai, Houhai and Oianhai."
 Illustrip: Interactive and printable map of Houhai

Tourist attractions in Beijing
Landforms of Beijing
Lakes of China
Geography of Beijing
Xicheng District